Point Piper  is a small, harbourside eastern suburb of Sydney, in the state of New South Wales, Australia,  east of the Sydney CBD, in the local government area known as the Municipality of Woollahra.

Point Piper has been historically regarded as Australia's most expensive suburb. In 2011, Wolseley Road was ranked as the ninth-most expensive street in the world, at $38,900 per square metre.

Location
The suburb of Point Piper sits on Sydney Harbour, beside the suburbs of Rose Bay, Bellevue Hill and Double Bay. The streets in Point Piper are: Buckhurst Avenue, Longworth Avenue, New South Head Road, Redvers Street, Saint Mervyn's Avenue, Wolseley Road, Wolseley Crescent, Wingadal Place, Wentworth Place, Wentworth Street, Wunulla Road, and Wyuna Road.

Heritage listings 
Point Piper has a number of heritage-listed sites, including:
 10 Dunara Gardens: Dunara

Commercial area
Point Piper does not have a commercial area, and has few amenities or public facilities. The closest commercial areas are in nearby suburbs such as Rose Bay and Double Bay.

Beaches and reserves
Duff Reserve, off Wolseley Road, deep water point, popular for weddings and picnics
Lady Martin's Beach, Wunulla Road
Seven Shillings Beach, off New South Head Road
Redleaf Pool, off New South Head Road, on Seven Shillings Beach

Clubs
 The Scots College rowing shed, off Wolseley Road
 Royal Motor Yacht Club, 21 Wunulla Road
 Royal Prince Edward Yacht Club

Population
At the 2011 census, 1,404 people were living in Point Piper. In the 2016 census, the population had risen to 1,424 people. 56.1% of people were born in Australia and 71.3% of people only spoke English at home. The most common responses for religion were No Religion 28.3%, Catholic 20.0%, Judaism 13.6% and Anglican 13.3%.

At the 2021 census, there were 1,334 people in Point Piper.

Point Piper, in combination with Darling Point, Edgecliff and Rushcutters Bay, was named as the wealthiest area in Australia, according to information from the Australian Taxation Office in 2013.

Housing
Point Piper is home to some of the most expensive and exclusive homes in Australia, holding the record for the three most expensive house sales nationwide ($130m, $100m, $95m). There are only eleven streets in Point Piper; the main road is Wolseley Road. The price per square metre of real estate in Point Piper is one of the most expensive in the world.

Notable sales

Uig Lodge $130m (2022) - Purchased by Scott Farquhar and Kim Jackson.

Fairwater $100m (2018) - Purchased by Mike and Annie Cannon-Brookes

Edgewater $95m (2020) - Purchased by John Li

Elaine $71m (2017) - Purchased by Scott Farquhar and Kim Jackson.

Altona $60 (2016) - Jiaer Huang

Routala $50m (2018) - David Fox

Akuna $45m (2022) - Purchased by Scott Barlow

Deauville $45 (2017) - Purchased by Neville Crichton

Other notable properties

Wingadal - John Symond's mansion on Wingadal Place, reportedly cost over A$70 million to build (excluding land), easily making it Australia's most expensive, privately owned residential home.

Wolseley Rd - Three adjoining sites on Wolseley Rd valued collectively at $99.5m have been purchased by Alexandra and Gabriel Jakob.  A single dwelling is planned on the consolidated site.

As at 2010, Wolseley Road was the world's ninth-most expensive residential street at up to $38,000 per square metre.

Notable residents
Jimmy Bancks (1889–1952), the creator of Ginger Meggs, lived at Deloraine until 1 July 1952, when he died from a heart attack the age of 63.
Edgar Bainton (1880–1956), British-born composer and conductor.
Sir Daniel Cooper, 1st Baronet, colonial merchant and politician, started construction of Woollahra House 
Chris Corrigan, Qube Holdings chairman
Neville Crichton, car dealer
John George Nathaniel Gibbes, a resident of Point Piper House
Bruce Jackson (deceased), audio engineer, who lived in the mansion Altona in his youth 
Sir Frank Lowy , former Westfield Group founder and chairman
Sir Charles Mackellar  (1844–1926), an Australian politician and surgeon
Dorothea Mackellar  (1885–1968), Australian poet best known for My Country, born at Dunara, in Point Piper
Lady Martin, Isabella Martin, estranged wife of Sir James Martin, Premier of New South Wales lived in Woollahra House 
Sir William McMahon, Prime Minister of Australia and wife Lady McMahon
Lachlan Murdoch, businessman and wife Sarah
John Piper (1773–1851), a colonial military officer who received the first land grant in the area
Sir Frank Renouf, New Zealand financier (deceased) and wife Susan Renouf
Rene Rivkin, stockbroker (deceased)
John Symond, founder of Aussie Home Loans
Doctor Frank Tidswell and his wife Edith, lived at Deloraine, next to Duff Reserve
Malcolm Turnbull, former Prime Minister and wife Lucy, businesswoman and former Lord Mayor of Sydney
Mike Cannon-Brookes, billionaire co-founder of Atlassian

References

External links

 
Suburbs of Sydney
New South Head Road, Sydney